Jennifer G. Murphy is a Canadian environmental chemist and an associate professor at the University of Toronto. She is known for her research how air pollutants such as  increased reactive nitrogen affect the global climate.

Early life and education 
In 2000, she graduated with honors at McGill University and earned her Bachelor of Science in Chemistry with a minor in Environmental Science. She then, worked to get her Ph.D. in Physical Chemistry at the University of California Berkeley from 2000 to 2005. Later on that year, she went to the University of East Anglia to get her post doctorate, finishing in 2006.

Career and research 
Murphy is a professor at the University of Toronto under the Department of Chemistry. Since starting as a faculty member in 2007, her research has focused on understanding the effects of atmospheric pollutants on air quality and the Earth's climate. Her work entails development and application of new analytical techniques for use in measurement of trace components of the atmosphere. This includes measurements made as both part of short-duration field intensives and longer-term monitoring efforts. Through the development and usage of long-term, precise and accurate observations with adequate geographic coverage and spatial resolution, Murphy and her group work to improve the process-level representation of chemical systems and biosphere-atmosphere exchange in earth systems models. 

From 2007-2016, she held a title as Tier II Canada Research Chair. Then, from 2015-2018, she was the Associate Chair of Graduate Studies.

She is one of the members on the Board of Trustees with the Royal Canadian Institute for Science. This prestigious organization strives to educate the Canadian public through innovative and engaging ways of teaching science. She is currently a member of the Scientific Steering Community (SSC) of the International Global Atmospheric Chemistry organization (IGAC).

Awards and honors 

 2019 Earned the Ascent Award in the field of Atmospheric Sciences from the American Geophysical Union (AGU)

Publications 
Murphy specializes her research in Atmospheric Chemistry, Biogeochemistry and Analytical Chemistry. Within these, she focuses on measuring reactive nitrogen compounds from the field, in order to assess her understanding of the rates and mechanisms of chemical transformations in the environment. Advanced analytical techniques are required to interpret air quality, climate change, acid precipitation and ecosystem function. Some of her most recent and well-known works are listed below:

Dimethyl Sulfide in the Summertime Arctic atmosphere: Measurements and Source Sensitivity Simulations, (2016), Atmospheric Chemistry and Physics
 An Atmospheric Constraint on the NO2 Dependence of Daytime Near-Surface Nitrous Acid (HONO), (2015), Atmospheric Chemical Society
 Experimental and Theoretical Understanding of the Gas Phase Oxidation of Atmospheric Amides with OH Radicals: Kinetics, Products, and Mechanisms, (2014), American Chemical Society
Improved Characterization of Gas–Particle Partitioning for Per- and Polyfluoroalkyl Substances in the Atmosphere Using Annular Diffusion Denuder Samplers, (2012), American Chemical Society
Long term changes in nitrogen oxides and volatile organic compounds in Toronto and the challenges facing local ozone control, (2009), Elsevier Ltd.

References 

21st-century Canadian chemists
McGill University Faculty of Science alumni
University of California, Berkeley alumni
Living people
Year of birth missing (living people)
21st-century Canadian women scientists
Canadian women chemists